Homona obtusuncus is a species of moth of the family Tortricidae first described by Józef Razowski in 2013. It is found on Seram Island in Indonesia. The habitat consists of lower montane forests.

The wingspan is about 25 mm. The ground colour of the forewings is ferruginous cream with pale ferruginous suffusions and rust markings, suffused with black at the edges of the wing. The hindwings are yellowish cream.

Etymology
The species name refers to the shape of the uncus and is derived from Latin obtusus (meaning blunt).

References

Moths described in 2013
Homona (moth)